"The Bride" is a song recorded by American country music group Trick Pony.  It was released in July 2004 as the first single from the album R.I.D.E..  The song reached #27 on the Billboard Hot Country Singles & Tracks chart.  The song was written by Liz Hengber, Darryl Burgess and Lee Ann Burgess.

Chart performance

References

2004 singles
2004 songs
Trick Pony songs
Songs written by Liz Hengber
Asylum Records singles
Curb Records singles
Music videos directed by Peter Zavadil